The women's 5000 metres event at the 2007 Summer Universiade was held on 13 August.

Results

References
Results

5000
2007 in women's athletics
2007